Fragapalooza (also referred to as Frag or Fraga by participants) is an annual video game festival/LAN party that takes place in Leduc, Alberta, Canada. The name Fragapalooza was derived from the Military Slang "Frag" and "palooza" which is the suffix for any type of named festival or gathering like lollapalooza. Traditionally held in the summer, it runs over a period of four days. In 2008, it was Canada's largest LAN party event having reached approximately 900 attendees at its peak.

History and background
Fragapalooza was started in Edmonton, Alberta in 1997 by Gil "StraT" Amores., David Chan, Derek French, Scott Beuker, and Poh Tan. The first event consisted primarily of an FPS called Quake and was held in a hangar at the Edmonton Municipal Airport. It has since evolved into a much larger annual gathering, occasionally drawing attendees from across Canada and the United States.

Fragapalooza is a Not-For-Profit event, where all proceeds from seat sales and Sponsorship are rolled into the event itself to cover prizing, rentals, and various other event costs. Fragapalooza is completely volunteer run.

The event requires participants to supply their own consoles or computers (sometimes referred to as BYOC).

Milestones
 A proof-of-concept event called Quakefest was held at The Node Room in 1996. Gil & Poh ran the event. It was well accepted and was determined that a larger venue was in order. Hence Fragapalooza in the following years.
 In November 2002, a one time 'Fragapalooza East' event was held in Mississauga, Ontario.
 In July 2006, Fragapalooza held its 10 Years in the Making event, marking its 10th year in Edmonton.
 In February 2009, Fragapalooza held its first winter event in Grande Prairie, Alberta attended by approximately 100 people.
 In 2009 Fragapalooza started to expand its location selections to the Edmonton Proper Area, driven both by costs and availability of supporting infrastructure in venues.
 In 2010 Fragapalooza started to hold events in Leduc, Alberta, which is within the Edmonton Proper area, but about 20 minutes outside the city.
 In 2016 Fragapalooza held its "20 Years in the Making" event.

Sponsors
Fragapalooza has had notable sponsors in the past including Intel and NVIDIA have both previously sponsored the gaming convention. In 2004, NVIDIA sponsored Fragapalooza offering 20 GeForce FX 5950 Ultra graphics cards to winners and runners-up of the official LAN game tournaments. In late 2002, companies such as Sympatico, Intel, Cisco Systems, ATI, Microsoft, E-Compuvison and Digital Extremes sponsored the 3 day gaming festival billed as Fragapalooza East. In 2007, professional gaming store, Razer, was invited to sponsor Fragapalooza, the company offered numerous products as prizes worth around $600.

Additionally, sponsors may make presentations to the attendees to promote their new products or technologies as well as selling their products directly.

Activities and competitions
Besides the opportunity to win prizes in the events official tournaments, gamers are given the chance to win "impromptu" competitions. In 2006, for example, on Fragapalooza's 10th anniversary, a dodgeball tournament was arranged. The organizers attempted to break the record for the largest dodgeball game ever at a LAN party. The record, at the time, was held by an event that occurred in Portland that had 200 participants. Crucial technology, a sponsor of the 2006 Fragapalooza event, attempted to break the record with 300 gamers taking part. Bad weather, specifically rain, caused the withdrawal of most of the participants resulting in the record not being broken. Nevertheless, the match went ahead and three winners were selected and each given 2GB of Crucial DDR2 RAM.

Another non-video game competition organized at the Fragapalooza 2006 event was a "crab walk" race across the west side of the Mayfield convention centre. The participants were instructed to crab walk across the centre floor and all the way back again. Paramedics were present at the scene in the event of any accidents. The three selected winners of the race received free computer hardware from Cooler Master and Memory Express.

Other official competitions may include:
The Wall Hang: This competition was held at the Mayfield Trade Center where an eight-foot wall stretched across the venue.  Competitors would hang from the wall with the last person to fall being declared the winner.
Keyboard Toss: Competitors are invited to throw their keyboards across the venue at a distant object.  Competitors who hit the object or comes closest would win a new keyboard (thrown keyboards often broke).
Binary Rock-Paper-Scissors: 256 attendees compete in a single-elimination tournament of Rock Paper Scissors.
Chair Race: Contestants attempt to ride their chair across the floor, the winner being the person to get the farthest, or go the straightest.
Dance-off: A crowd judged dance competition.
Paper Airplanes: Attendees are invited to create a paper airplane of their own design and fly them across the venue with the winner being declared based on either distance or accuracy.
Garbage Architect: Teams of four compete to build impressive or humorous structures out of garbage found at the event.  These usually consist of recyclable beverage containers and cardboard boxes.
Photoshopper: a crowd judged Photoshop contest.
Case Mod Competition: Last held in the 2004 event, attendees' modded computers were adjudicated based on various criterion.
Scavenger Hunt: Groups of competitors compete to gather the most items from a list.
Paper-shredded Puzzle: Attendees invited to put together a one-page puzzle after it has been shredded in a paper shredder.

Attendees and sponsors will occasionally organize their own unofficial competitions ranging from standard tournaments to marathons where competitors are disqualified in the event they leave their chair, fall asleep, disconnect from the game or otherwise stop playing.  These competitions usually have smaller prizes funded by the organizer or a participant pool.

Staff will frequently issue challenges or tasks to all attendees over the intercom and prizes awarded to the first person to accomplish the task. The goals of the challenges vary significantly and they are almost always unique from year to year. Attendees have in the past been asked to blue-screen their computer, bring an attendant's pendant from a previous year, buy the staff dinner, find an item hidden inside the venue, and obtain a valid product code for an obscure out-of-print video game. These challenges are usually held at night when larger competitions and events cannot take place due to lighting and noise constraints.

Past events
All events within Edmonton, Alberta unless otherwise specified

References

External links
Fragapalooza.com, The official Fragapalooza website 

Gaming conventions
Recurring events established in 1997